This is a list of Bolivian departments by Human Development Index as of 2021.

See also
List of countries by Human Development Index

References 

Human Development Index
Bolivia
Bolivia